Perlstein may refer to :

Rick Perlstein (born 1969) is an American historian and journalist. 
Helen Perlstein Pollard (born 1946) is an American academic ethnohistorian and archaeologist.

Jewish surnames